The Papoulis-Marks-Cheung approach is a theorem in multidimensional Shannon sampling theory that shows that the sampling density of a two-dimensional bandlimited function can be reduced to the support of the Fourier transform of the function. Applying a multidimensional generalization of a theorem by Athanasios Papoulis, the approach was first proposed by Robert J. Marks II and Kwang Fai Cheung. The approach has been called "elegant," "remarkably" closed, and "interesting."

The Theorem 

Prelee and Neuhoff describe the Papoulis-Marks-Cheung approach as follows.

In deriving their result, Marks and Cheung relied on Papoulis’ generalized sampling expansion.

Explanation 

The Papoulis-Marks-Cheung approach is best explained by example. Consider from Figure 1 the half circle shown on the right half plane. A signal’s spectrum, is zero outside the half circle. Inside the circle, the spectrum’ is arbitrary but is well behaved. The half-circle, with unit radius, has an area of   (cycles per unit length) squared.

According to the Papoulis-Marks-Cheung approach, the sampling density for the image  can be reduced to  samples per unit area. The Papoulis-Marks-Cheung approach informs how to do this.

To the right in Figure 1 is pictured a rectangular replication of the half circle which occurs when the two-dimensional function is sampled at spatial locations shown in Figure 2. 

This replication is a consequence of the multidimensional sampling theorem that shows that the sampling of a two-dimensional signal in the spatial  domain results in spectrum replication in the Fourier domain. If the uniform sampling density were lower, the replications would overlap and an attempt at reconstruction of the original function would result in image aliasing. The sampling density to achieve this is equal to the area of the rectangular lattice cell of the spectrum replication. As confirmed by Figure 2, the sampling density required to achieve the spectral replication is therefore  samples per unit area.

To see how this reduction happens, consider Figure 3 where the  rectangular lattice cell is divided into  identical squares. Note that two of these squares lie totally in an area where the spectral replication is identically zero. These squares are shaded light green. Think of each of  squares as spectra of  different two-dimensional signals. All of the samples for the signals corresponding to the light green areas are zero and do not have to be considered. Since the samples corresponding to these squares do not have to be considered (they are all zero), the overall sampling density is reduced from  samples per unit area to  samples per unit area. 

The corresponding reduction in sampling density is shown in Figure 4 where the red dots are locations where samples need not be taken. A single cell containing one red dot is shown shaded. The area of the cell is The corresponding reduction in sampling density is shown in Figure 4 where the red dots are locations where samples need not be taken. A single cell containing one red dot is shown shaded. The area of the cell is  units. The sampling density is therefore, as also seen from the areas of two green squares in Figure 3, reduced by  samples per unit area.

Extension 
In the previous example, the squares in Figure 3 can be made arbitrarily small and increased in number so that, asymptotically, all of the area equal to zero can be covered. Thus, the sampling density can be reduced to the support of the spectrum, i.e., to the area where the spectrum is not identically zero.

The Papoulis-Marks-Cheung approach can straightforwardly be generalized to higher dimensions. Also, replication geometry need not be rectangular but can be any shape that will tile the entire  plane such as parallelograms and hexagons.

A more detailed mathematical description of the Papoulis-Marks-Cheung approach is available in the original paper by Marks and Cheung and their derivative work.

References 

Theorems in Fourier analysis